Anthony Martin was an Anglican priest in Ireland during the first half of the 17th-century.

Martin was born in County Galway and educated at Emmanuel College, Cambridge and Trinity College, Cambridge. Martin became Vicar of Yagoestown in 1618. He was Prebendary of Castleknock at St Patrick's Cathedral, Dublin from 1619 to 1620;  and Archdeacon of Dublin from then until 1625.  He was also Rector of Battersea, Treasurer of Cashel Cathedral and Dean of Waterford 'in commendam

Martin was the Bishop of Meath from 1624 (and Provost of Trinity College Dublin) until his death in July 1650.

References

1650 deaths
Alumni of Emmanuel College, Cambridge
Anglican bishops of Meath
People from County Galway
Provosts of Trinity College Dublin
Archdeacons of Dublin
Deans of Waterford